Peter Broderick (born January 20, 1987) is an American musician and composer from Carlton, Oregon. He has released solo material under his own name, been a member of Efterklang, and played with several ensembles as a session musician.

Biography
Broderick was born in Searsmont, Maine in 1987 but raised mostly in Carlton, Oregon. He learned a number of musical instruments whilst at school, and went on to become a session musician, playing violin, banjo, musical saw, and mandolin on recordings by M. Ward, Zooey Deschanel, Dolorean and others. He played and toured with numerous groups, including Horse Feathers, Norfolk & Western, Loch Lomond and Laura Gibson.
In mid-2007, Broderick joined the Danish ensemble Efterklang in Copenhagen to join their touring band after the release of their album Parades.  After touring, he released a mini album of solo piano music, Docile, on the Swedish label Kning Disk, as well as a 7″, Retreat/Release, his first full-length album of piano and string based compositions, Float, and an orchestral concept album, Music for Falling From Trees, on the US label Western Vinyl and British label Erased Tapes. He released two albums in collaboration with Machinefabriek.

He is the brother of Heather Woods Broderick, also a solo artist and Efterklang collaborator. He married Irish folk musician Brigid Mae Power in 2016 and they currently live in south London.

Discography

Solo recordings
Peter Broderick & Friends Play Arthur Russell (2018, Pretty Purgatory, MP3)
Partners (2016, Erased Tapes, CD, LP, MP3)
All Together Again (2017, Erased Tapes, CD, LP, MP3)
Partners (2016, Erased Tapes, CD, LP, MP3)
Colours of the Night (2015, Bella Union, CD, LP, mp3)
Float 2013 (2013, Erased Tapes, CD, LP, mp3)
These Walls of Mine (2012, Erased Tapes, CD, LP, mp3)
http://www.itstartshear.com(2012, Cooperative Music / Bella Union, CD, LP)
How They Are (2010, Bella Union, CD, LP, mp3)
Three Film Score Intakes (2010, Schedios, 3″ CD-R, 200 copies)
Music for a Sleeping Sculpture of Peter Broderick (2009, Slaapwel Records, CD, mp3, 500 copies)
4 Track Songs (2009, Type Recordings, CD, 2xLP)
Five Film Score Outtakes (2009, Secret Furry Hole, 3" CD-R, 200 copies)
Music for Falling From Trees (2009, Erased Tapes/Western Vinyl, CD, mp3)
Ten Duets (2009, Digitalis Ltd, Compact Cassette)
Games Again/Roscoe (2008, Bella Union, 07")
Home (2008, Bella Union, Hush, Type, CD, LP, mp3)
Float (2008, Type Recordings, CD, LP, mp3) and Float 2013 (2013, Erased Tapes, CD, LP, mp3)
Docile (2007, Kning Disk, CD, 10", mp3)
Retreat/Release (2007, Type Recordings, 07")

Collaborations 
 "Blank Grey Canvas Sky" with Machinefabriek (2009, Fang Bomb, CD, LP, mp3)
 "Falling from Trees" with Neon Dance (2009, Erased Tapes/Neon Dance, dance score commission)
 "Mort Aux Vaches" with Machinefabriek and Jan and Romke Kleefstra, Chris Bakker, Nils Frahm (2010, Staalplaat, CD)
 "Music for Confluence" (2011, Erased Tapes, CD, mp3)
 "Wonders" (as Oliveray) with Nils Frahm (2011, Erased Tapes, LP, mp3)
 "Let Your Hands Be My Guide" with Chantal Acda, Nils Frahm, Gyda Valtysdottir and Shahzad Ismaily (2013, Gizeh Records, CD, LP, mp3)
 "Soul" with Rival Consoles (2013, Erased Tapes, CD, LP, mp3)
 "Sunday Songs" as part of Beacon Sound Choir (2016, First Terrace Records, LP)
 "Find the Ways" (as Allred & Broderick) with David Allred (2017, Erased Tapes, CD, LP, mp3)

References

External links
 Peter Broderick on Myspace
 Discography (updated 2013)
 Official Site 

People from Searsmont, Maine
Musicians from Portland, Oregon
People from Carlton, Oregon
Living people
1987 births
Bella Union artists
Hush Records artists
Erased Tapes Records artists
Western Vinyl artists